Impaled is a death metal band from Oakland, California. The band's name is a backronym, standing for "Immoral Medical Practitioners And Licentious Evil-Doers".

History
The band was founded by guitarist Sean McGrath in late 1996, who joined with drummer Raul Varela, guitarist Jared Deaver (ex-Deeds of Flesh, ex-Severed Savior) and bassist Ron Dorn to record their 1997 demo Septic Vomit.

In 1998, Leon del Muerte, former guitarist for Exhumed, was added to the line-up as a lead vocalist. With the departure of Jared Deaver, del Muerte took on second guitar duties in addition to lead vocals. Due to schedule conflicts as regards touring, Ron Dorn was asked to leave and was temporarily replaced by bassist Ross Sewage, who concurrently was playing with Exhumed and Ludicra. Sewage later opted to become a full-time member of Impaled, along with McGrath.

In 1999, the band released a second demo, From Here to Colostomy, for which the band gained some recognition. A year later, the band were invited to contribute to a split 7-inch record with deathgrind band Cephalic Carnage by Italian label Headfucker Records. The band then released its first full-length album The Dead Shall Dead Remain, which was followed by a tour of the US with Nile and Incantation.

In the same year, the band went on to release a 7-inch split with Engorged and toured again, this time with death metal bands Vader and Skinless. Impaled also recorded tracks for tribute albums for both Carcass and Impetigo. Soon after the tour, del Muerte departed, to be replaced by guitarist Andrew LaBarre, formerly of Hoarfrost and Prevail.

The new line-up recorded Mondo Medicale in 2002, to relative acclaim from metal fans. The album invited public scrutiny for its cover art, which was supposedly being banned in several countries (the album was later re-released with a censored version of the original artwork). However, in interviews members of the band have stated that the sticker that can be found on some copies of the album proclaiming "Banned in 84 Countries" was merely a publicity stunt. Soon after touring for Mondo Medicale, LaBarre left the band and was replaced by Jason Kocol.

In 2004, the concept album Death After Life was recorded, with production duties undertaken by Trey Spruance. It was not released until 2005 due to scheduling difficulties at the label.

Impaled members Sean McGrath and Ross Sewage also play in the band Ghoul, who have released four albums.

In 2007, the band signed to Willowtip Records for the European distribution of their new album. Their next album, The Last Gasp, was completed in August and released November 5, 2007. Leaked versions of the album appeared on various P2P networks in the leading months, which were a prank by the band themselves and contained the track "Captain Butt-beard the Pirate", which taunted and insulted the listener for their thievery.

Band members

Current members
 Raul Varela – drums (1995–present)
 Leon del Muerte – vocals (1997–2001, 2012–present), guitars (1997–2001)
 Sean McGrath – guitars, vocals (1999–present)
 Ross Sewage – bass, vocals (1999–present)
 Jason Kocol – guitars, vocals (2004–present)

Each member of Impaled is occasionally represented by a nickname:
 Dr. Sean "Bloodbath" McGrath – M.D. (Medical Deviant)
 Dr. Jason Kocol – E.M.T. (Emergency Metal Technician)
 Dr. Raul Varela – Ph.D. (Doctor of Philandering)
 Dr. "Monsewer" Ross Sewage – R.N. (Registered Nut)

Former members
 Jared Deaver – guitars, vocals (1995–1998)
 Ron Dorn – bass (1995–1998)
 Jeremy Frye – vocals (1995–1996)
 Andrew LaBarre – guitars, vocals (2001–2004)

Timeline

Discography

Albums
The Dead Shall Dead Remain (2000), Necropolis Records)
Mondo Medicale (2002, Death Vomit Records)
Death After Life (2005, Century Media)
The Last Gasp (2007, Willowtip Records)
The Dead Still Dead Remain (2013, Willowtip Records)

EPs
Medical Waste (2002, Death Vomit Records)
Digital Autopsy (2007, Vomitcore)

Compilations
Choice Cuts (2001, Death Vomit Records)
HF.Seveninches.Collection.Vol1 – Reissue of split with Cephalic Carnage, compiled with the Exhumed/Retaliation split (2008, Dracma/Masterpiece/Ugugumo)

Splits
Split with Cephalic Carnage (1999, Headfucker Records)
Split with Engorged (2000, Discos Al Pacino)
Dementia Rex – split with Haemorrhage (2003, Razorback Records)

Demos
Septic Vomit (1997, Self-released)
From Here to Colostomy  (1997, Self-released)

References

External links
 Official website
 Official MySpace
 

Death metal musical groups from California
Musical groups established in 1996
Goregrind musical groups
Century Media Records artists